Hashiye Ke Log is an independent film to be produced through crowd funding and Individual Producers. It is going to be the second Directorial film of Pawan K Shrivastava.
Hashiye Ke Log is a cinema which tries to capture the marginalized India. This is a story of a man belonging to 'Dalit' community, which forms a major part of India's marginalized millions, showcasing his struggle in standing against oppression and for a dignified life for himself and many others like him. It also takes on the present day growth policy which is majorly exclusionist and has not yielded much for many.

Genre 
The genre of the film is Fiction Drama.

Synopsis 

Mahatma Gandhi gave a 'Talisman' to use in moments of doubt and confusion. He asked us to recall the face of the poorest, most defenceless, most powerless man we have encountered. Hashiye Ke Log is an attempt to view the process of economic development undertaken by successive governments, during the past two decades-characterized as the period of unprecedented growth rates,'GDP's'-in the light of Gandhi's Talisman. It brings forth the tale of millions who have been suffering social exclusion for ages, and even in free India where justice and equality are the bedrock of governance, they are being subjected to economic exclusion. It questions the exclusionist economic policy as to why bumper GDP's numbers have failed to reach those in the lowest rung. The dream of economic and social justice can be clearly seen crashing as such the Hashiye Ke Log becomes all the more important at this juncture. Moreover, it also an attempt to showcase the life stories of marginalized sections of our society who, unfortunately, have been missing from popular mediums of expression, particularly cinema.

Crowd funding 
Crowd funding is a concept which may attract the filmmakers who want to use the culture of philanthropy to make the films without depending on big production houses. This concept has been used by many film directors who want to satisfy their desire for art by making films on ideas in their mind. After successfully making Naya Pata through Crowd Funding now Pawan K Shrivastava is going to make his second film through Crowd Funding.

Pawan has Started the Crowd funding Campaign for Hashiye Ke Log through IndieGoGo a Crowd Funding Platform. The team has also shot an Introductory Video which describes his film Hashiye Ke Log. Recently Pawan Had a Press conference followed by a Panel Discussion on "Presence of Marginalized section in Indian Cinema" at Constitution Club of India, New Delhi, where he launched his Crowd Funding Campaign.

Production 
Hashiye Ke Log will be Shot in Chhattisgarh, Bundelkhand and New Delhi. The Project was scheduled to be completed by March 2016.

Production team 
 Director - Pawan K. Shrivastava
 DOP - Saket Saurabh
 Executive Producer - Vaibhav Pratap Singh
 Assistant Director - Simranjeet Kaur
 Assistant Director - Prakhar Vihaan
 Assistant Director - Srinjay Thakur
 Assistant Director - Amitesh Prasun
 Assistant Director - Sushil Suryavanshi
 Assistant Camera   - Harshit Saini
 Production team    - Charles Thomson
 Visual Art and Art Direction - Gopal Shunya
 Sound              - Anurag Diwedi
 Production Head    - Vaibhav Pratap Singh
 Design and creative- Vikas Rai
 Web and Technology - Ajayendra Urmila Tripathi
 Social Media       - Anurag Dixit
 Media              - Praveen Yadav
Content and Research- Neha Rathi and Avinash Pandey

References

External links
 Hashiye Ke Log on Facebook
 Hashiye Ke Log on Youtube
 Hashiye Ke Log on Twitter
 Support Hashiye Ke Log on IndieGOGo

Crowdfunded films